NTPC Limited, formerly known as National Thermal Power Corporation Limited, is an Indian central public sector undertaking under the ownership of the Ministry of Power,  Government of India  which is engaged in generation of electricity and allied activities. The headquarters of the psu is situated at New Delhi. NTPC's core function is the generation and distribution of electricity to State Electricity Boards in India. The body also undertakes consultancy and turnkey project contracts that involve engineering, project management, construction management, and operation and management of power plants.

In 2016, police fired on a group of people peacefully protesting the seizure of their lands by this power company and killed four of them.

The PSU has also ventured into oil and gas exploration and coal mining. It is the largest power company in India with an electric power generating capacity of 71,594 MW. Although the company has approx. 16% of the total national capacity, it contributes to over 25% of total power generation due to its focus on operating its power plants at higher efficiency levels (approx. 80.2% against the national PLF rate of 64.5%). NTPC currently produces 25 billion units of electricity per month.

NTPC currently operates 55 power stations (24 Coal, 7 combined cycle gas/liquid fuel, 2 Hydro, 1 Wind, and 11 solar projects). Further, it has 9 coal and 1 gas station, owned by joint ventures or subsidiaries.

It was founded by Government of India in 1975, which now holds 51.1% of its equity shares (after divestment of its stake in 2004, 2010, 2013, 2014, 2016, & 2017) In May 2010, NTPC was conferred Maharatna status by the Union Government of India, one of only four companies to be awarded this status. It is ranked 400th in the Forbes Global 2000 for 2016.

History

1975 to 1994
The company was founded on 7 November 1975 by India's former Prime Minister Indira Gandhi. as "National Thermal Power Corporation Private Limited". It started work on its first thermal power project in 1976 at Shaktinagar (named National Thermal Power Corporation Private Limited Singrauli) in Uttar Pradesh. In the same year, its name was changed to "National Thermal Power Corporation Limited". In 1983, NTPC began commercial operations (of selling power) and earned profits of INR 4.5 crores in FY 1982–83. By the end of 1985, it had achieved power generation capacity of 2000 MW.
In 1986, it completed synchronisation of its first 500 MW unit at Singrauli. In 1988, it commissioned two 500 MW units, one each in Rihand and Ramagundam. In 1989, it started a consultancy division. In 1992, it acquired Feroze Gandhi Unchahar Thermal Power Station (with from Uttar Pradesh Rajya Vidyut Utpadan Nigam of Uttar Pradesh. By the end of 1994, its installed capacity crossed 15,000 MW.

1995 to 2004
In 1995, it took over the Talcher Thermal Power Station from Orissa State Electricity Board.
In the year 1997, the Government of India conferred it with "Navratna" status. In the same year, it achieved a milestone of the generation of 100 billion units of electricity in a year. In 1998, it commissioned its first Naptha-based plant at Kayamkulam with a capacity of 350 MW. In 1999, its plant in Dadri, which had the highest plant load factor (PLF) in India of 96%, was certified with ISO-14001. During 2000, it commenced construction of its first hydro-electric power project, with 800 MW capacity, in Himachal Pradesh.
In 2002, it incorporated 3 subsidiary companies: "NTPC Electric Supply Company Limited" for forward integration by entering into the business of distribution and trading of power; "NTPC Vidyut Vyapar Nigam Limited" for meeting the expected rise in energy trading; "NTPC Hydro Limited" to carry out the business of implementing and operating small and medium hydropower projects. In the same year its installed capacity crossed 20,000 MW.

Listing: NTPC got listed on BSE and NSE on 5 November 2004. Against the issue price of ₹62 per share, it closed the first day of listing with ₹75.55 per share. On the day of listing, it became the third largest company in India in terms of market capitalisation.

2005 to present
In October 2005, the company's name was changed from "National Thermal Power Corporation Limited" to "NTPC Limited". The primary reason for this change was the company's foray into hydro and nuclear based power generation along with backward integration of coal mining. In 2006, it entered into an agreement with the Government of Sri Lanka to set up two units of 250 MW each in Trincomalee in Sri Lanka.
During 2008 and 2011, NTPC entered into Joint Ventures with BHEL, Bharat Forge, NHPC, Coal India, SAIL, NMDC and NPCIL to expand its business of power generation. By the end of 2010, its installed capacity crossed 31,000 MW.

The company in 2009 joined forces with other state enterprises Rashtriya Ispat Nigam, Steel Authority of India, Coal India, National Minerals Development Corporation to invest in coal mining operations through a joint venture vehicle named International Coal Ventures Private Limited (ICVL). In July 2014 ICVL acquired a 65 percent stake in the Benga coal mine in Mozambique from the Rio Tinto Group In December 2022, the Market cap of NTPC limited was Rs. 1,66,249.34 crore.

Operations
NTPC operates from 70 locations in India, one location in Sri Lanka and 2 locations in Bangladesh.Headquarters: In India, it has 8 regional headquarters (HQ):

Scheduling and generation dispatch: The scheduling and dispatch of all the generating stations owned by National Thermal Power Corporation are done by respective regional load dispatch centers, which are the apex body to ensure integrated operation of the power system grid in the respective region. All these load dispatch centers come under Power System Operation Corporation Limited (POSOCO).

NTPC plants and their capacity
The total installed capacity of the company is 62,110 MW (including 11,755 MW through JVs/Subsidiaries) across the country,(24 Coal based stations, 7 gas based stations, 1 Hydro station, 1 small hydro, 11 Solar PV, and 1 Wind based Station) and 25 Joint Venture stations (9 coal based, 4 gas based, 8 hydro, 1 small hydro 2 Wind, and 1 Solar PV).

Thermal Power

Coal-based power plants(Own Operational)

Coal-based (JV/ Subsidiary)

Gas-based power plants(Own Operational)

Gas-based (JV/ Subsidiary)

Hydro Power
The company has also stepped up its hydroelectric power (hydel) project implementation. Some of these projects are:

Hydro-electric power plants(Own operational)

Hydro-electric power plants(JV/ Subsidiary)

Renewable Energy
NTPC's current renewable power plants in solar and wind include:

Solar photovoltaic power plants(Own Operational)

Solar photovoltaic power plants(JV/ Subsidiary)

Wind Power(Own Operational)

Wind Power(JV/ Subsidiary)

Small Hydro
 Singrauli CW Discharge (Small Hydro) 8 (4x2) MW is on the discharge canal of Singrauli Super Thermal Power Station in Uttar Pradesh. All units of this project are under commercial operation.
 NTPC-THDC has installed 24(8x3) MW Small Hydro Project at Dhukwan on Betwa river in Jhansi district of Uttar Pradesh.

Future goals
The company has developed a long-term plan to become a 128,000 MW company by 2032. NTPC Limited is on an expansion spree to meet the power requirements of the country – it has targeted to add 14,058 MW in 12th Plan (from FY13 to FY 17) of which it had already added 4,170 MW in 2012–13, 1835 MW in 2013-14 1290 MW in 2014-15 and 1150 MW from April 2015 to 30 November 2015.

As of 30 November 2015, the company has 23,004 MW under construction. 
NTPC is diversifying its capacity mix with much emphasis on renewable energy. As on 30 November 2015, NTPC has 110 MW Solar PV capacity under operation, 250 MW under construction, and 1260 MW under tendering. The company intends to add 10000 MW of Solar PV capacity in the next five years. On 18 July 2015, NTPC declared commercial its first Hydro Power plant at Koldam in the State of Himachal Pradesh. The company has a long-term plan to reduce its fossil fuel capacity mix to 56% by 2032.

NTPC also plans to go global. The public sector company has signed a memorandum of agreement with the Government of Sri Lanka and Ceylon Electricity Board for setting up a 500 MW (2x250) coal-based thermal power plant in the island nation. An MoU has also been signed with Kyushu Electric Power Co. Inc., Japan, for establishing an alliance for exchange of information and experts from different areas of the business. The company is also in the process of finalizing an MoU with Nigeria for setting up power plants against the allocation of LNG on a long-term basis for NTPC plants in India. NTPC also developing a joint-venture coal-based power plant 1,320 MW (2x660) with Bangladesh Power Development Board known as Bangladesh India Friendship Power Company in Rampal, Bangladesh which is facing tremendous opposition from the people of Bangladesh owing to the plant's dangerously close proximity to the Sundarbans.

NTPC has also been allotted coal blocks namely, Pakri Barwadih, Chatti Bariatu, and Kerandari in Jharkhand; as well as, Talipalli, Chhattisgarh, and Dulanga in Odisha. Except for Pakri Barwadih all other blocks were canceled by a decision of the Supreme Court of India on 24 September 2014. However, the company was again allotted canceled block under Section 5 of Coal Mines (Special Provision Act 2015) Besides these blocks, the Ministry of Coal has according to its press release dated 3 July 2013 allotted four more blocks namely, Banai and Bhalmuda in Chhattisgarh, Chandrabila and Kudanli Laburi in Odisha. Two more blocks namely Mandakini- II and Banhardih are expected to be allotted to NTPC soon. All these mines are having estimated geological reserves of 6.7 billion tonnes. NTPC has appointed Mining Cum Development Operator (MDO) for its Pakri Barwadih mine.

Listings and shareholding
The equity shares of NTPC are listed on the Bombay Stock Exchange, where it is a constituent of the BSE SENSEX index, and the National Stock Exchange of India, where it is a constituent of the S&P CNX Nifty.

In Sep. 2015, the Government of India held around 74.96% equity shares in NTPC. Over 680,000 individual shareholders hold approx. 1.92% of its shares. Life Insurance Corporation of India is the largest non-promoter shareholder in the company with 10.03% shareholding.

In August 2017, the GOI divested further its 5% stake in NTPC through OFS (Stock Exchange Mechanism) and reduced the holding of GOI in NTPC to 5,76,83,41,760 shares i.e. 64.96% out of total 8,24,54,64,400 shares.

The balance is held by public, FIIs, Mutual Funds, and Banks.

Employees
As of 31 March 2015, the company had 24,067 employees. The attrition rate for the FY 2014–15, including the trainee employees and employees working for subsidiaries and JVs, was 1.35%.  Man MW Ratio of the company has fallen from 0.77 in the FY11 to 0.61 in FY 15. NTPC has been awarded continuously as great places to work for in PSUs category.

 NTPC was ranked second among the 250 largest power producer energy traders in the world by Platts in 2015. On overall basis NTPC ranked 56th amongst Platts 250 companies.
 In 2009, it received ICSI National Award for Excellence in Corporate Governance.

Criticism
Land acquisition in tribal areas: The company (and other PSUs in India) has been allotted land for setting power plants and related infrastructure in rural/tribal areas across the country by Central Government and various state governments. Some of these lands have been allotted to NTPC (and other PSUs in India) through Land Acquisition Acts passed by Central/State Governments. Wherever a land acquisition law is enacted, it also places a liability on the PSUs/governments to take actions for proper rehabilitation of displaced residents of that rural/tribal area. Governments/PSUs are criticized if they do not fulfill their liability towards displaced residents. In many areas where land acquisition is proposed through land acquisition laws, local residents oppose the forcible acquisition as they are not sure of proper rehabilitation.

Future growth: Draft National Electricity Plan, 2016 prepared by GoI states that India does not need additional coal-fired power plants until 2027 with the commissioning of various coal-based power plants which are presently under construction. India is no more facing regular power shortages to purchase electricity at high prices offering higher profit margins to the power generating companies. With the help of assured power purchase agreements (PPA) from the state-owned DisComs, earlier NTPC was able to sell its power at higher margins on the deployed capital and higher overhead costs. Moreover, its main expertise of generating power from coal-fired stations is becoming obsolete in terms of technology and economics against non-conventional power generation like wind, solar, etc. In future, for the satisfactory growth mainly from wind and solar power projects, NTPC shall be ready to slash all its extra profit margins on capital deployed to bring down the power sale price at par with the IPPs to secure the projects in open competitive bidding.

Government has decided to scrap the coal fired power stations which are more than 25 years old to reduce the pollution. Instead of scrapping old pulverised coal fired units, NTPC should replace coal with torrefied crops waste/biomass as fuel in these units (nearly 11,000 MW) to make them profitable and productive assets without contributing to pollution.

To utilize its proven O&M expertise, NTPC may venture on a major scale to implement the solar thermal storage power as they can offer clean and cheaper electricity than fossil fuel-fired power generation plants

Rather than install emissions-cutting technologies, NTPC has chosen to lobby the government to extend pollution reduction deadlines.

Controversies with projects:
Loharinag Pala Hydro Power Project by NTPC Ltd: Loharinag Pala Hydro Power Project (600 MW i.e. 150 MW × 4 units) is located on the river Bhagirathi (a tributary of the Ganges) in Uttarkashi district of Uttarakhand state.  This is the first project downstream from the origin of the Ganges at Gangotri. The project was at the advanced stage of construction when it was discontinued by the Government of India in August 2010.
 Rupasiyabagar Khasiabara HPP, 261 MW in Pithoragarh, Uttarakhand State, near China Border. This project is yet to be given investment approval..
Badarpur Thermal Power Station has been permanently closed due to pollution issue in Delhi NCR . The total installed capacity of all of its units was 705 MW which has been retired and fully closed since 15 October 2018.

See also

 Electricity in India
 Energy in India
 List of companies of India
 List of public sector undertakings in India
 2017 NTPC power plant explosion

References

Check here Railway NTPC Admit Card Details

External links
 
 

Companies based in New Delhi
BSE SENSEX
NIFTY 50
Electric power companies of India
Government-owned companies of India
Public utilities established in 1975
Electric-generation companies of India
Ministry of Power (India)
Indian companies established in 1975
1975 establishments in Delhi
Companies listed on the National Stock Exchange of India
Companies listed on the Bombay Stock Exchange